Beech Grove is a city in Marion County, Indiana.

Beech Grove and Beechgrove may also refer to:

Beech Grove, Arkansas, an unincorporated community
Beech Grove, Morgan County, Indiana, an unincorporated community
Beech Grove, Kentucky (disambiguation)
Beech Grove, Tennessee (disambiguation)
Beech Grove, Texas, an unincorporated community
Beech Grove, Virginia, an unincorporated community
Beech Grove, West Virginia, an unincorporated community
Beechgrove, a cricket ground in Derry, Northern Ireland
Beechgrove (TV series), a BBC Scotland gardening television series

See also